Fishery Falls is a locality in the Cairns Region, Queensland, Australia.

Geography 

The Mulgrave River forms the eastern boundary of the locality; it flows into the Coral Sea in the neighbouring locality of Deeral. The land in the locality is flat (about 10 metres above sea level) and is predominantly freehold farming land with sugarcane the principal crop.

The Bruce Highway passes through the locality from south to north-west with the North Coast railway line running immediately parallel and east of the highway, but there is no railway station within Fishery Falls. There is also a cane tramway network within the area to deliver the sugarcane to the Mulgrave Sugar Mill in Gordonvale.

History 
The locality is presumed to be named after the waterfall of the same name which is located in neighboroughing Wooroonooran approximately 1 km west of the locality of Fishery Falls.

McDonald's Creek State School opened on 22 September 1913. In 1916 the spelling was changed to McDonnell's Creek State School. It is now simply known as McDonnell Creek State School.

Education 
McDonnell Creek State School is a government co-educational primary (P-6) school at 69273 Bruce Highway. In 2016, the school had an enrolment of 25 students with 2 teachers (1 full-time equivalent) and 6 non-teaching staff (2 full-time equivalent). The school opened its doors 22 September 1913. As the name suggests, it is located very near to McDonnell Creek approximately 2 km south of the township.

Attractions 
The South Sea Islander Memorial at the corner of the Bruce Highway and McMahon Drive commemorates over 60,000 Kanakas who were contracted to work in the sugarcane plantations from 1863 to 1906. Although some came voluntarily, others were misinformed about their contracts, while some were kidnapped (a practice known as blackbirding).

References

Further reading

External links 

Cairns Region
Localities in Queensland